"Goody Goody" is the first single from the album True to Life, released by the hip-hop and freestyle singer Lisette Melendez in 1993.

The song was a moderate hit in the U.S., reaching No. 53 on the Billboard Hot 100. In Japan, the song reached No. 95 on the Oricon charts.

The music video was directed by Rosie Perez.

Tracks

Charts

References

1993 singles
Lisette Melendez songs
1993 songs